SWCC or Swcc may refer to:
 Special warfare combatant-craft crewmen, a team in the United States Special Operations Command
 the Saline Water Conversion Corporation, a government corporation that operates desalinization plants and power stations in Saudi Arabia
 Socialism with Chinese Characteristics, the official ideology of the Chinese Communist Party.